The Runeberg prize (Finnish: Runeberg-palkinto, Swedish: Runebergspriset) is a Finnish literature prize founded in 1987.

The prize is named in honour of Finnish national poet Johan Ludvig Runeberg (1804–1877) and is awarded annually on his birthday, 5 February. The prize is awarded to a literary work by a Finnish writer in Finnish or Swedish. The Runeberg prize is currently endowed with 20,000 euros.

Runeberg prize winners

References

Awards established in 1987
Finnish literary awards